The Beast of New Haven were an ice hockey team in the American Hockey League in the 1997–98 and 1998–99 seasons.  The team was based in New Haven, Connecticut, and played at the Veterans Memorial Coliseum, which was demolished in 2007.  The Beast were affiliated with the Carolina Hurricanes and the Florida Panthers.  This franchise was known as the Carolina Monarchs from 1995 to 1997.

Season-by-season results
 Carolina Monarchs 1995–1997
 Beast of New Haven 1997–1999

Regular season

Playoffs

See also
Professional Hockey In Connecticut

References

  

 
Ice hockey clubs established in 1997
Sports clubs disestablished in 1999
Ice hockey teams in Connecticut
1997 establishments in Connecticut
1999 disestablishments in Connecticut
Sports in New Haven, Connecticut
Carolina Hurricanes minor league affiliates
Florida Panthers minor league affiliates